William Hickok may refer to:

Bill Hickok (football), American football player and businessman
William O. Hickok IV, member of the World Figure Skating Hall of Fame
 William Hickok (athlete), United States national shot put champion

Note: Wild Bill Hickok's given name was not William, but James.